Woolf & Freedman Film Service was a UK film distributor which was founded by film producer C. M. Woolf, and which operated from 1919 to 1934. The company distributed more than 140 films over a 15-year period. In 1935, Woolf formed a new company, General Film Distributors.

Some of Alfred Hitchcock's early silent films were produced by Gainsborough Pictures and distributed by Woolf & Freedman.

Partial filmography

The Fire Raisers (1934) 
A Cuckoo in the Nest (1933) 
Early to Bed (1933) 
Channel Crossing (1933) 
Leave It to Smith (1933) 
I Was a Spy (1933) 
The Ghoul (1933) 
Prince of Arcadia (1933) 
My Lucky Star (1933) 
Waltz Time (1933) 
Falling for You (1933) 
I Lived With You (1933) 
It's a Boy (1933) 
Yes, Mr. Brown (1933) 
The Woman in Command (1933) 
The Blarney Kiss (1933) 
The Little Damozel (1933) 
It's a King (1933) 
Just My Luck (1933) 
The King's Cup (1933) 
Up for the Derby (1933) 
The Midshipmaid (1932) 
Say It With Music (1932) 
Be Mine Tonight (1932) 
The Flag Lieutenant (1932) 
Leap Year (1932) 
The Lodger (1932) a.k.a. The Phantom Fiend in the US
The Mayor's Nest (1932) 
The Love Contract (1932) 
Thark (1932) 
Love on Wheels (1932) 
White Face (1932) a.k.a. Edgar Wallace's White Face the Fiend
A Night Like This (1932) 
The Chinese Puzzle (1932) 
Murder at Covent Garden (1932) 
Condemned to Death (1932) 
Happy Ever After (1932) 
The Blue Danube (1932) 
Mischief (1931) 
Splinters in the Navy (1931)
Venetian Nights (1931) 
The Ghost Train (1931) 
Almost a Divorce (1931) 
Black Coffee (1931) 
Captivation (1931) 
The Calendar (1931) released in the US as Bachelor's Folly
The Chance of a Night Time (1931) 
The Lyons Mail (1931) 
Alibi (1931) 
The Speckled Band (1931) 
Madame Guillotine (1931) 
Third Time Lucky (1931) 
Plunder (1931) 
Up for the Cup (1931) 
Tons of Money (1930) 
Just for a Song (1930) 
Canaries Sometimes Sing (1930) 
Once a Gentleman (1930) 
On Approval (1930) 
Hell's Island (1930) 
Sisters (1930) 
Temptation (1930) 
Wolves (1930) 
The Big Fight (1930) 
Call of the West (1930) 
Soldiers and Women (1930) 
Around the Corner (1930) 
Cock o' the Walk (1930) 
Journey's End (1930) 
Ladies of Leisure (1930) 
Prince of Diamonds (1930) 
A Royal Romance (1930) 
Tembi (1930) 
Guilty? (1930) 
The Loves of Robert Burns (1930) 
Personality (1930) 
One Embarrassing Night (1930) 
Peace of Mind (1930) 
Mexicali Rose (1929) 
Splinters (1929) 
Woman to Woman (1929) 
Flight (1929) 
City of Play (1929) 
The Wrecker (1929) 
Taxi for Two (1929) 
The Crooked Billet (1929) 
The Return of the Rat (1929) 
The Woman in White (1929) 
The Bondman (1929) 
The Burgomaster of Stilemonde (1929) 
Black Waters (1929) 
When Knights Were Bold (1929) 
A Peep Behind the Scenes (1929) 
A Light Woman (1928) 
Haus Nummer 17 (1928) 
The Scarlet Daredevil (1928) 
The First Born (1928)
A South Sea Bubble (1928) 
Balaclava (1928) 
The Rolling Road (1928) 
The Vortex (1928) 
Easy Virtue (1928) 
Victory (1928) 
Dawn (1928) 
The Constant Nymph (1928) 
A Window in Piccadilly (1928) 
The Gallant Hussar (1928)
The Blue Peter (1928) 
Cinders (1927)  
One of the Best (1927) 
Der Geisterzug (1927) 
Downhill (1927) a.k.a. When Boys Leave Home in the US
The Queen Was in the Parlour (1927) 
Blighty (1927) 
The Lodger: A Story of the London Fog (1927) 
Mumsie (1927) 
The Rat (1926) 
The Triumph of the Rat (1926) 
The Mountain Eagle (1926) 
The Sea Urchin (1926) a.k.a. The Cabaret Kid
A Typical Budget (1925)*
Battling Bruisers (1925)*
Cut It Out (1925)*
So This Is Jollygood (1925)*
The Blunderland of Big Game (1925)*
Satan's Sister (1925) 
Polar Bonzo (1925) 
White Shadows (1924)
Bonzo (1924) 
Jail Birds (1924) 
Mumming Birds (1924)
Woman to Woman (1923)
A Gamble With Hearts (1923) 
Early Birds (1923) 
Billy's Rose (1922) 
Fallen by the Way (1922) 
In the Signal Box (1922) 
Sal Grogan's Face (1922) 
Sir Rupert's Wife (1922) 
The Lights o' London (1922) 
The Magic Wand (1922)
The Old Actor's Story (1922) 
The Parson's Fight (1922) 
The Road to Heaven (1922) 
The Street Tumblers (1922) 
Ticket o' Leave (1922)
Damaged Goods (1919)

(*) Short comedy films directed by Adrian Brunel

References

External links
Woolf & Freedman at IMDB

Film distributors of the United Kingdom